Qareh Su (also Romanized as Qareh Sū; also known as Sīāh Āb) is a village in Jafarbay-ye Jonubi Rural District, in the Central District of Torkaman County, Golestan Province, Iran. At the 2006 census, its population was 1,562, in 305 families.

References 

Populated places in Torkaman County